Bojan Roganović (born 28 September 2000) is a Montenegrin footballer who plays as a defender for Torpedo Moscow.

Career 
He made his Montenegrin First League debut for Budućnost Podgorica on 14 March 2018 in a game against FK Dečić.

Career statistics

References

External links 
 

2000 births
Footballers from Podgorica
Living people
Montenegrin footballers
Montenegro youth international footballers
Montenegro under-21 international footballers
Association football defenders
FK Budućnost Podgorica players
OFK Titograd players
FK Čukarički players
FC Torpedo Moscow players
Montenegrin First League players
Serbian SuperLiga players
Russian Premier League players
Montenegrin expatriate footballers
Montenegrin expatriate sportspeople in Serbia
Expatriate footballers in Serbia
Montenegrin expatriate sportspeople in Russia
Expatriate footballers in Russia